Make It Stop is a 1991 album by Indiana punk band Zero Boys. It was recorded in one day at GALT Studios, Culver, Indiana.

Track listing
 "Beach Blanket Boi-oi-oi"
 "Bloods Good"
 "Godless Girl"
 "On The Pavement"
 "Trust Anyone"
 "You And Your God"
 "Amerika"
 "Indianapolis"
 "Fly Bite"
 "Parasite Man"
 "Black Network News"
 "Open"
 "Doctors Are Doin' It For Themselves"
 "Positive Change"

References

1991 albums
Zero Boys albums